Nadja Ramskogler (born 4 June 2000) is an Austrian tennis player.

Ramskogler has a career high ITF junior combined ranking of 1970 achieved on 18 January 2016.

Ramskogler made her WTA main draw debut at the 2018 Upper Austria Ladies Linz in the doubles draw partnering Mavie Österreicher.

References

External links

2000 births
Living people
Austrian female tennis players